Joanne Lesley Malone CBE (born 5 November 1963) is a British perfumer and founder of the companies Jo Malone London and Jo Loves. Malone founded Jo Malone London in 1990 and later sold the company in 1999 to its current parent company Estee Lauder Companies. In 2011, Malone founded Jo Loves.

Biography
Malone was born on 5 November 1963, and grew up in a council house in Bexleyheath, South East London. She had severe dyslexia, and left school aged 13 to care for her mother, who had a stroke.

In 1999, Malone sold Jo Malone London to Estée Lauder Companies for "undisclosed millions". In 2011, she started a new fragrance company, Jo Loves.

In 2008, Malone received an MBE, then in 2018 a CBE. In 2015, she was a castaway on BBC Radio 4's Desert Island Discs.

Malone is married to former surveyor Gary Willcox, and they have a son together.

In 2003, Malone was diagnosed with an aggressive form of breast cancer, and after a year of treatment her cancer was in remission.

References

1963 births
Living people
Commanders of the Order of the British Empire
British retail company founders
People from Bexleyheath
Place of birth missing (living people)
People with dyslexia
Perfumers